Ithaca Tompkins International Airport  is a county-owned airport located in the Town of Lansing, three miles northeast of Ithaca, the county seat and only city in Tompkins County, New York. The National Plan of Integrated Airport Systems for 2019–2023 categorized it as a primary commercial service facility. Federal Aviation Administration records say the airport had 99,070 passenger boardings (enplanements) in 2018.

Nonstop scheduled commercial commuter-jet service is available to John F. Kennedy International Airport and Newark Liberty International Airport.
(See below for the specific airlines servicing these destinations.)

History

The original Ithaca Municipal Airport was west of downtown Ithaca, near the inlet of Cayuga Lake. The site was identified as a likely flying field in 1914 by pilot Charles Niles, who considered relocating to Ithaca to establish a practice field. In December 1914, the Thomas Brothers Aeroplane Co. relocated to Ithaca and in 1915 established a flying school using the lake and a field near the inlet.

Established prior to 1916, Ithaca Municipal Airport is believed to be the second airport to be established in New York state. The turf runway was no longer in official guidebooks by 1940. Due to its lakeshore location, the airport also provided a dock and anchorage for seaplanes. Bound by the Lehigh Valley Railroad freight yards on the south side, the Cayuga Lake marshes on the north side and fog in the lake valley, the growth potential for the airport was limited. The former airport site is now Cass Park, including a hangar which was renovated in 1975 to house the Hangar Theatre.

In 1946, Cornell University and the city of Ithaca began planning for a new airport on East Hill on the university-owned land in Lansing, New York. East Hill Airport opened in 1948 with Robinson Airlines as its primary tenant. On July 1, 1956, the 23 parcels of land that made up the airport were conveyed by Cornell University to Tompkins County for the sum of $324,500. At that point, East Hill Airport was renamed Tompkins County Airport; it later was renamed Ithaca Tompkins Regional Airport.

The original municipal airport was the base for Aviation pioneer Cecil Robinson's aerial photography missions. In 1945, shortly after the end of World War II, he created Robinson Airlines at the municipal airport before transferring operations to the new East Hill Airport in 1948. Scheduled DC-3 flights to East Hill began in 1948; the airline changed its name to Mohawk Airlines in 1952 and merged with Allegheny Airlines in 1972. Later, the airport was served by Empire Airlines and Air North; the latter became Brockway Air, which merged into Piedmont Airlines. Allegheny, Piedmont and Empire all eventually merged into US Airways, which later merged into American Airlines. Other carriers included Commuter Airlines, Mall Airways, Command Airways (later operating under the name American Eagle), Ransome Airlines (also operating under the name TW Express, United Express) and Continental Express.

Expansion
In 1994, a new, $11-million terminal opened, replacing the cramped original building. Runway 32 has an instrument landing system and a medium-intensity approach light system with runway alignment lights. Runway 14 has an instrument approach based on the VOR/DME at the airport.

Airline traffic peaked in 1990 at 226,813 passengers, but by the end of the decade the small size of the market and proximity to Syracuse Hancock International Airport and other regional airports led Trans World Airlines, United Airlines and finally Continental Airlines to leave.

In 2001, the airport renamed itself the Ithaca Tompkins Regional Airport, replacing its former moniker: the Tompkins County Airport.

In late 2004, after negotiations with the county, Northwest Airlines agreed to add Northwest Airlink service to Detroit Metropolitan Wayne County Airport, which began on May 2, 2005. US Airways nonstops to Pittsburgh, a focus city, resumed on November 9, 2005, but ended on April 1, 2006, due to low yield. Passenger traffic has improved with the additional service; the airport served about 140,000 passengers in 2004, increasing to around 170,000 in 2007. On October 6, 2008, Continental Connection resumed service between Ithaca and Newark Liberty International Airport with four daily flights. In 2011, the airport served 242,493 passengers on three airlines.

In 2009,  Regional Elite Airline Services took over ground-handling duties from Mesaba Airlines for the Delta Connection flights to Detroit. As of November, 2012, all ground-handling for Delta and United Airlines was handled by DAL Global Services.

Starting on March 24, 2012, US Airways Express ended all service between Ithaca and New York–LaGuardia as part of a slot-exchange deal with Delta.

The 2013 Federal sequester did not result in the closure of the airport's control tower. The U.S. Department of Transportation restored the funding needed to support the continued operation of the Ithaca airport control tower.

In 2014, Robert Nichols, who had been the airport's general manager since 1990, retired.

On September 12, 2017, the airport announced that it had been awarded $2.4 million in grants from the FAA to rehabilitate the general aviation tarmac, add new perimeter fencing and lighting and build a second passenger boarding bridge. Simultaneously, United Airlines announced that it was upgrading its Ithaca to Newark service from 37-seat Dash 8 turboprop aircraft to 50-seat Embraer ERJ-145 commuter-jet aircraft, meaning that all commercial passenger flights to and from Ithaca would be aboard jet aircraft.
On May 3, 2018, New York State Governor Andrew Cuomo announced (at the airport) a new $22 million project to double the size of the 25-year-old airport terminal, adding six new gates, three new jet bridges and a customs facility to allow international air travel to Ithaca, as well as expanded office space for the Transportation Security Administration and the serving airlines. Cuomo returned to Ithaca on October 16, 2018, to help break-ground for the newly renamed "Ithaca-Tompkins International Airport." At groundbreaking, the total cost was expected to be $24.7 million, and the renovated terminal would include a restaurant and bar. The addition was designed by architecture firm C&S Companies.

On July 12, 2018, the airport announced that American Airlines would start nonstop service to Charlotte, North Carolina, with one weekly flight on Saturdays beginning in December, 2018 (operating daily as of March 2022). At the same time, United Airlines announced the cancellation of its service to Newark, replacing it with a nonstop to Washington-Dulles International Airport effective October 4 (canceled on March 2, 2022).

The second phase of construction began in the spring of 2019 and was completed on December 20, 2019. Construction costs had increased to $14.2 million in state funding, $10 million in federal funding and $10.6 million from Tompkins County: $34.8 million.

Due to the COVID-19 pandemic, flights to and from Philadelphia were dropped in September, 2020.

Facilities
The airport covers 531 acres (215 ha) at an elevation of 1,099 feet (335 m). It has two runways: 14/32 is 6,977 by 150 feet (2,127 x 46 m) asphalt and 15/33 is 2,018 by 50 feet (615 x 15 m) turf.

In 2011 the airport had 41,286 aircraft operations, average 113 per day: 77% general aviation, 23% air taxi, <1% military, and <1% airline. 57 aircraft were then based at the airport: 77% single-engine, 9% multi-engine, and 14% jet.

For over 60 years, the airport has been home to the East Hill Flying Club.  The club offers lessons and the use of nine small planes to its members. It is also the home of Taughannock Aviation which provides business jet charter and management as well as being the fixed-base operator.

United Express uses the two-class Bombardier CRJ550 between ITH and Newark International Airport/EWR. Delta Connection uses the Bombardier CRJ900 between ITH and John F. Kennedy International Airport/JFK.

Airlines and destinations

Passenger

Destinations Map

Statistics

Top destinations

Top airlines

Ground transportation

Bus
TCAT Route 32 travels to Cornell University and downtown Ithaca (Ithaca Commons) seven days a week. Buses operate hourly, or more frequently, from morning until early evening. Regular one-way fare is $1.50; reduced fare of 75¢ applies to seniors age 60 and up, youths age 6–17, and persons with disabilities. Fares may be paid with a TCAT card, or with U.S. currency and/or coins; no change is given by the driver. Free transfers are available for connections to Ithaca College, and other parts of Ithaca/Tompkins County served by TCAT.

Rental Cars
Avis / Budget and Hertz all have rental counters inside the airport terminal. Each offers discounted rates for Cornell University faculty, staff, and alumni. Vehicles are located in a lot just outside the terminal.

Taxi
Ithaca Dispatch (Cayuga, university, Yellow Cab) operates a taxi stand at the airport, although it may be necessary to call in advance, especially during peak hours. Fares to the airport are standardized. Uber and Lyft also operate in Ithaca.

References

External links
 
 Ithaca Tompkins Regional (ITH) at New York State DOT Airport Directory
 Aerial image as of March 1995 from USGS The National Map
 
 
 

Airports in New York (state)
Transportation in Tompkins County, New York
Buildings and structures in Tompkins County, New York